This is a list of Honorary Fellows of Lucy Cavendish College, Cambridge

 Judi Dench
 Anna Ford
 Margrethe II of Denmark
 Anne McLaren
 Pauline Perry, Baroness Perry of Southwark
 Alison Richard
 Stella Rimington
 Janet Todd
 Claire Tomalin

Fellows of Lucy Cavendish College, Cambridge
Lucy Cavendish College, Cambridge
Lucy Cavendish